is a Japanese Trotskyist and former senior member of the Revolutionary Communist League, National Committee. In June 2017, he was arrested for the murder of a policeman on 14 November 1971. His 46 years spent on the run is the longest in Japanese history.

Biography

Osaka was a member of the Japan Revolutionary Communist League National Committee, called the Chūkaku-ha, or “middle core faction.”

He was put on the wanted list in 1972 after being charged with murder, assault and other offenses.

1971 Shibuya riot
According to police, on November 14, 1971, during a demonstration by students and other activists protesting the ratification of a Japan-U.S. treaty on the reversion of Okinawa, which degenerated into a riot, he attacked Tsuneo Nakamura, a 21-year old police officer, battering him with a steel pipe and setting him on fire with a petrol bomb. The officer died from his injuries.

2017 arrest
In June 2017, Osaka was arrested for obstructing police who raided an apartment in Hiroshima used as a hideout of the Chukaku-ha while searching for a fellow activist. They charged him with obstruction before later discovering his identity through DNA testing. He was charged with murder.

References

Year of birth missing (living people)
Living people
Japanese murderers
Japanese communists